Peter Hirsch (born 1925) is a figure in British materials science.

Peter Hirsch may also refer to:
Peter Hirsch (microbiologist) (born 1928), German microbiologist
Peter Hirsch (conductor) (born 1956), German conductor
Peter Hirsch (ice hockey) (born 1979), Danish former ice hockey goaltender